Joy FM is a privately owned radio station in Accra, the capital of Ghana. The station is owned and run by the media group company Multimedia Group Limited. It is arguably the leading radio station in Ghana that broadcasts in the English language. Established in 1995 by Kwasi Twum, the founder of Multimedia Group Limited, Joy FM became the first private radio station to be licensed in Ghana.

Notable personalities
Nathan Kwabena Adisi
Gary Al-Smith
Doreen Andoh
Tommy Annan Forson
Samson Lardy Anyenini
Emefa Apawu
Nathaniel Attoh
Manasseh Azure
Dzifa Bampoh
Lexis Bill
Bola Ray
Komla Dumor
Kojo Oppong Nkrumah
Kwaku Sakyi-Addo
Owuraku Ampofo
Mark Okraku-Mante
Francisca Kakra Forson

References

External links
 Official website Myjoyonline.com

Radio stations in Ghana
Greater Accra Region
Mass media in Accra